Cristian Edgardo Álvarez Cruz (born 19 April 1978 in Santa Ana) is a former Salvadoran professional footballer and currently manager.

Club career
Álvarez came through the youth system at C.D. FAS and signed professional terms with them in 1995.

In 1999, he joined Portuguese Second Division club Espinho on loan, but returned to El Salvador after only one season for play with C.D. Dragón.

In 2001, Álvarez rejoined C.D. FAS.

International career
Álvarez made his debut for El Salvador in an October 2000 FIFA World Cup qualification match against St Vincent & the Grenadines and has earned a total of 17 caps, scoring no goals.

He has represented his country in 3 FIFA World Cup qualification matches and played at the 2001 and 2005 UNCAF Cups.

His final international game was a November 2006 friendly match against Panama.

Honours

Player

Club
C.D. FAS
 Primera División
 Champion: Clausura 2002, Apertura 2002, Apertura 2003, Apertura 2004, Clausura 2005, Apertura 2009
 Runners-up: Clausura 1999, Clausura 2004, Clausura 2006, Apertura 2006, Apertura 2007, Clausura 2008, Clausura 2011, Clausura 2013, Apertura 2013

References

External links
 

1978 births
Living people
Sportspeople from Santa Ana, El Salvador
Salvadoran footballers
El Salvador international footballers
C.D. FAS footballers
S.C. Espinho players
Expatriate footballers in Portugal
2002 CONCACAF Gold Cup players
2005 UNCAF Nations Cup players
Association football midfielders